Zabolottia is an urban-type settlement in Kovel Raion of Volyn Oblast in Ukraine. It is located close to the border with Belarus, on the west shore of Lake Turske in the drainage basin of the Western Bug. Population:

Economy

Transportation
Zabolottia railway station is on the railway connecting Kovel and Brest. There is infrequent passenger traffic to Kovel.

The settlement has access, via Ratne, to Highway M19 connecting Chernivtsi via Ternopil and Lutsk with Kovel.

References

Urban-type settlements in Kovel Raion